In Your Room is the third studio album by Agua de Annique, formed by the former Gathering vocalist Anneke van Giersbergen. It was released on 30 October 2009.

Track list
"Pearly"
"Hey Okay!"
"I Want"
"Wonder"
"The World"
"Sunny Side Up"
"Physical"
"Home Again"
"Wide Open"
"Longest Day"
"Just Fine" (co-written by Devin Townsend)
"Adore" (written by Jacques de Haard and Cyril Crutz)

All songs written by Anneke van Giersbergen except where noted

Personnel
Anneke van Giersbergen - Vocals, keys, guitar
Joris Dirks - guitar, vocals
Jacques de Haard - Bass guitar
Rob Snijders - Drums

References

External links
 Official site

2009 albums
Anneke van Giersbergen (band) albums